Acanthoclymeniidae is a family of early, primitive, clymeniid ammonoid cephalopods that lived during the Late Devonian.  At one time this family was known to contain a single genus, Acanthoclymenia, named by Hyatt in 1900, which is its type.

Acanthoclymeniidae are characterized by their small slightly involute, subdiscoidal, widely umbilicate shells that reach only a few centimeters in diameter. This description applies to the genus Acanthoclymenia as well.

References
 Miller, Furnish, and Schindewolf (1957) Paleozoic Ammonidea, Treatise on Invertebrate Paleontology Part L, Ammonoidea. Geological Soc of America.

 
Devonian ammonites
Prehistoric cephalopod families